General elections were held in Malaysia between Saturday, 24 August and Saturday, 14 September 1974. Voting took place in all 154 parliamentary constituencies of Malaysia, each electing one Member of Parliament to the Dewan Rakyat, the dominant house of Parliament. State elections also took place in 360 state constituencies (except Sabah) on the same day. The elections were the first and only general elections for Tun Abdul Razak as Prime Minister following his appointment to the position in 1970. They were also the first general elections for Barisan Nasional (BN), a new political alliance replacing the Alliance Party; with the Pan-Malaysian Islamic Party (PAS), Parti Gerakan Rakyat Malaysia (PGRM) and the People's Progressive Party (PPP) joining the parties from the old Alliance.

Once Parliament had been dissolved on 31 July 1974, the Election Commission fixed 8 August 1974, as Nomination Day and 24 August 1974, as Polling Day. Candidates were returned unopposed in 47 constituencies. The 1,060,871 electors from these constituencies therefore did not cast ballots.  Another 88 Front members were later successful, thus enabling their alliance to gain an overwhelming majority in the House. This result was a victory for Barisan Nasional which won 135 of the 154 seats. 10 additional Parliament seats was created in the Peninsular Malaysia in 1974.

Results

By state

Johore

Kedah

Kelantan

Kuala Lumpur

Malacca

Negri Sembilan

Pahang

Penang

Perak

Perlis

Sabah

Sarawak

Selangor

Trengganu

Aftermath
After the election, Sarawak National Party (SNAP) became the largest opposition party in the Malaysian parliament and James Wong was appointed the opposition leader. After 2 months, he was detained under Internal Security Act. Datuk Seri Edmund Langgau Anak Saga from the SNAP party later succeeded him. James Wong was detained for almost two years before negotiation led by Datuk Amar Leo Moggie Anak Irok resulting in SNAP joining the Barisan Nasional.

See also
1974 Malaysian state elections

Notes

References

General elections in Malaysia
Malaysia
General